Chad Dukes may refer to:

 Chad Dukes (radio personality)
 Chad Dukes (American football)